Yekaterina Yuryevna Volkova (born 16 March 1974) is a Russian actress of theatre and cinema, singer, songwriter, and model.

Biography
Yekaterina Volkova was born in the city of Tomsk, Russian SFSR, Soviet Union. She grew up in the city of Tolyatti, Samara Oblast.

Career
In 1992, Volkova appeared in the film Eastern Roman.

Personal life

She was  married to Eduard Limonov. From this marriage, she has a son, Bogdan (b. 2006), and daughter, Aleksandra (b. 2008). The couple broke up.

Filmography

References

External links
 

1974 births
Living people
People from Tomsk
20th-century Russian actresses
21st-century Russian actresses
Russian film actresses
Russian stage actresses
Russian television actresses
21st-century Russian singers
21st-century Russian women singers